Only in Dreams is the second album by Dum Dum Girls, released on September 27, 2011 by Sub Pop.

Two singles were released from the album. "Coming Down" was issued for streaming on July 19, 2011, and then a 7" was given away with pre-orders and first pressings of the album, on September 27.

"Bedroom Eyes" was issued for streaming on August 30, 2011, followed by a promo single distributed on September 26.

Critical reception

The album received generally positive reviews upon its release. At Metacritic, which assigns a normalized rating out of 100 to reviews from mainstream critics, the album received an average score of 74 based on 26 reviews, which indicates "Generally favorable reviews".

Spin awarded the album a rating of 8 out of 10, writing, "Gundred's richer-than-you-expect voice is the key to these jagged little pillows, whether dryly noting that a guy's 'Just a Creep,' soaring on 'Coming Down,' or lacing her echoes with sorrow on 'Hold Your Hand,' a reflection on her mother's death." In Lindsay Zoladz's 7.6-out-of-10 review, Pitchfork lauded the album's melodic risks within the genre of garage rock revival, "Only in Dreams isn't a perfect record, but a little while down the line it might end up looking like the beginning of something-- the first steps forward for the band, or perhaps a raising of the bar for this entire revival. I wouldn't put it past Dee Dee to be the leader of the pack." The New York Times echoed this viewpoint in Jon Caramanica's positive review, which stated, "Only in Dreams ... seethes with a beautiful, raging confidence, louder and fuller than anything they’ve done before, and better than the onetime peers they’re leaving behind." musicOMHs Gareth Ware's 4-out-of-5 review also agreed that "[Only in Dreams] showcases a remarkably assured collection of songs."

AllMusic was more critical of the Dum Dum Girls' new direction: "All this realness could be a deal breaker especially since Only in Dreams isn’t a fun and immediately enjoyable album like I Will Be was." PopMatters wasn't impressed with the overall sound of the album, saying, "Everything is layered and burnished into an eardrum-blasting sameness. There are no standouts or outright bombs, just 10 Dum Dum Girls songs; no more, no less.". Joe Marvilli from Consequence of Sound, in a negative review, felt that Only in Dreams needed more variety, stating, "You can only take so many variations of the same theme."

Track listing

Personnel
 Dee Dee – vocals, guitar
 Jules – guitar, vocals
 Bambi – bass, vocals
 Sandy – drums, vocals

Engineered by Alonzo Vargas, with assistance from Justin Smith. Mixed by Alonzo Vargas. Mastered by Joe LaPorta.

Release history

The first 1,900 copies of the LP version of the album were released on light pink vinyl as a "Loser Edition".

References

2011 albums
Dum Dum Girls albums